FC Fabus Bronnitsy was a Russian football team from Bronnitsy. It played professionally from 1995 to 2002. Their best result was 9th place in the Zone Centre of the Russian Second Division in 1999.

External links
  Team history at KLISF

Association football clubs established in 1995
Association football clubs disestablished in 2004
Defunct football clubs in Russia
Football in Moscow Oblast
1995 establishments in Russia
2004 disestablishments in Russia